Catalpa Canyon is a census-designated place (CDP) in McKinley County, New Mexico, United States. It was first listed as a CDP prior to the 2020 census.

The community is in the western part of McKinley County, bordered to the north by the city of Gallup, the county seat. Catalpa Canyon is a valley in the center of the CDP that drains north to the Puerco River in the eastern part of Gallup.

New Mexico State Road 602 passes through the western part of the CDP, leading north into Gallup and south  to Vanderwagen.

Demographics

Education
It is in Gallup-McKinley County Public Schools.

Most areas are zoned to Red Rock Elementary School, though some are zoned to Jefferson and Stagecoach elementaries. Most areas are zoned to Gallup Middle School, though some are zoned to Chief Manualito and John F. Kennedy middle schools. Most areas are zoned to Hiroshi Miyamura High School though some are zoned to Gallup High School.

References 

Census-designated places in McKinley County, New Mexico
Census-designated places in New Mexico